The Black Bay River is a river in Vieux Fort Quarter of the island nation of Saint Lucia.

See also
List of rivers of Saint Lucia

References 

Rivers of Saint Lucia